Harold Charles Richards (12 October 1925 – 2 June 2014) was an Australian civil engineer who co-founded the consulting engineering firm Hardcastle & Richards.

Career
Harold Richards studied engineering at the Royal Melbourne Institute of Technology. In 1951, he worked in the Design Section of Johns and Waygood, which was responsible for many of Australia's post-war infrastructure developments. In 1952, the co-founded Hardcastle & Richards with business partner Roy Hardcastle, as a result of winning the design competition for the Olympic Stadium for the 1956 Melbourne Olympic Games. However, a change in government caused the cancellation of the project.  The firm expanded to have offices in Melbourne, Perth, Sydney, Brisbane and Broken Hill.
The firm was involved in many civil engineering projects, including the King Street Bridge over the Yarra River.
In 1962, Hardcastle & Richards were invited by the School of Engineering at the University of Melbourne to participate in guiding students' final year design projects. These projects were based on actual projects in which the firm had been involved. This association with engineering education lasted five decades.

Other positions held:

Chairman of the Victorian Institute of Marine Science, 1994-1997
Chairman of the Marine and Freshwater Research Institute, 1997-1998
Member of the Board of Management, Greenvale Centre and Mount Royal Hospital, 1990-1991
President Emeritus, Broadmeadows College of TAFE, 1989-1993
Elder, St John's Uniting Church in Australia, 1977-2014
Councillor, Shire of Bulla, 1965-1985
President, Shire of Bulla, 1972
President of the Association of Consulting Engineers Australia, 1977-1980
Vice-President of the Australian College of Professions, 1975
National Vice-President, Institution of Engineers Australia, 1973-1975
Member of the National Capital Planning Committee, 1973-1978
Member of Board of Management, North West Hospital, Melbourne, 1991-1995

Philanthropy
For almost 50 years, Hardcastle & Richards were major donors to the School of Engineering at the University of Melbourne and to RMIT University. 
In 1979, a bronze relief by artist Michael Meszaros, entitled Compression and Tension was presented to the Department of Civil Engineering to mark the 25th anniversary of the founding of the firm.
Richards was the founder of the Rotary Club of Carlton in 1985 and its Charter President.

Honours
Member of the Order of Australia, 1980, for service to technical education 
Honorary Associate Professor, Department of Civil and Environmental Engineering, University of Melbourne
Elected Fellow, Institution of Engineers Australia
Paul Harris Fellow, Rotary International, 1995
Honorary Life Member, Rotary Club of Carlton, 2013

References 

1925 births
2014 deaths
Philanthropists from Melbourne
Rotary International leaders
Australian civil engineers
20th-century philanthropists